Helicostyla ticaonica is a species of medium-sized, air-breathing land snail, a terrestrial pulmonate gastropod mollusk in the family Camaenidae.

Subspecies
 Helicostyla ticaonica iloilana M. Smith, 1932
 Helicostyla ticaonica ticaonica (Broderip, 1841)

This species can be found in the Philippines.

References

External links
 Broderip, W. J. (1841). Description of shells collected and brought to this country by Hugh Cuming, Esq. Proceedings of the Zoological Society of London. 8
 Lea, I. (1840). Description of nineteen new species of Colimacea. Proceedings of the American Philosophical Society. 1: 173-175
 Hidalgo, J. G. (1896). Catalogue de espèces du genre Cochlostyla, Férussac, que vivent dans les Iles Philippines. Journal de Conchyliologie. 44: 237-353
 Hidalgo, J. G. (1896). Observations sur quelques Cochlostyla des Philippines. Journal de Conchyliologie. 44: 5-46
 Hidalgo, J. G. (1891-1904). Obras malacológicas. Estudios preliminares sobre la fauna malacológica de las Islas Filipinas. Atlas. Memorias de la Real Academia de Ciencias Exactas, Físicas y Naturales de Madrid, Madrid. 170 pls
 Hidalgo, J. G. (1887). Recherches conchyliologiques de M. Quadras aux ȋles Philippines. Journal de Conchyliologie. 35: 37-58, 93-192, pls. 2-7.
 Richardson, L. (1983). Bradybaenidae: Catalog of species. Tryonia. 9: 1-253 (page(s): 163; note: Incorrectly spelled as Helicostyla ticanoica (Broderip, 1841) in Index (pp. 226, 231, 248, 250).)

Camaenidae
Gastropods described in 1841